The first season of Haikyu!! anime television series is produced by Production I.G and directed by Susumu Mitsunaka, with Taku Kishimoto handling series composition and Takahiro Kishida providing character designs.  It adapted the "Karasuno High Team Formation" (chapters 1–35) and "Interhigh" (chapters 36–71) story arcs from the original manga series of the same name written by Haruichi Furudate. The series was announced in the manga's eighth volume, and aired from April 6 to September 21, 2014 on MBS, other JNN stations, and with English subtitles on Crunchyroll. The anime has been licensed for digital and home video release by Sentai Filmworks.

The series uses four pieces of theme music: two opening themes and two ending themes. From episodes 1-13, the opening theme song is "Imagination" by Spyair, while the ending theme song is "Tenchi Gaeshi" by Nico Touches the Walls. For episodes 14 through 25, the opening is "Ah Yeah" by Sukima Switch, and the ending is "LEO" by Tacica. "Ah Yeah" is also used as the ending for episode 14, which has no opening.



Episode list

References

2014 Japanese television seasons
Haikyu!! episode lists
Haikyu!!